I decembertid is a 2013 Malena Ernman Christmas album.

Track listing
"Counting Miracles" (duet with Jerry Williams)
"Så mörk är natten"
"Till Betlehem mitt hjärta"
"God Rest Ye Merry Gentlemen"
"Stilla natt" (Stille Nacht, heilige Nacht)
"Härlig är jorden"
"I decembertid"
"Marias vaggsång" (Mariae Wiegenlied)
"Jul, jul, strålande jul"
"I väntat på julen" ("Greensleeves")
"Håll mitt hjärta"
"You'll Never Walk Alone"
"O helga natt" (Cantique de Noël)

Contributors
Malena Ernman - singer
Anders Hansson - bass, drums, percussion, producer
Mats Bergström - guitar
Hans Backenroth - bass
Jesper Nordenström - piano
Beata Ernman, Greta Thunberg, "Emma", "Maja" - choir

Charts

Weekly charts

Year-end charts

References

2013 Christmas albums
Christmas albums by Swedish artists
Classical Christmas albums
Malena Ernman albums